Chalis Karod (Forty Crores) is a Bollywood film that was released in 1946. The film was directed by Nanabhai Bhatt for Chandra Art Productions. It had music composed by Gobindram and starred Nirmala Devi, Yakub, Arun, Agha, Gope and Shantarin.

References

External links
 

1946 films
1940s Hindi-language films
Indian musical films
1946 musical films
Indian black-and-white films